Tishyaraksha or Tissarakkhā (c. 3rd century BCE) was the last wife of the third Mauryan emperor, Ashoka. According to the Ashokavadana, she was responsible for blinding Ashoka's son and heir presumptive Kunala. She married Ashoka four years before his death. She was very jealous of the attention paid by Ashoka to the Bodhi-tree, and caused it to be killed by means of poisonous thorns.

Early life 
It is believed that Tishyaraksha was possibly born in Gandhara region and was a favourite maid of Ashoka's chief queen, Asandhimitra, and after her mistress died, she went to Pataliputra becoming a great dancer and charmed Ashoka with her dance and beauty.

Kunala
It is also believed that due to the age difference between her and Ashoka, she was attracted towards Kunala, a son of Ashoka who was religious in nature. Kunala regarded Tishyaraksha as his mother due to her place in the Mauryan Empire at the time. After perceiving rejection from Kunala, Tishyaraksha turned so furious that she decided to blind him. It is believed that the eyes of Kunala were attractive and beautiful and that they had originally attracted Tishyaraksha to him..

Plot
When the Chandragupta Sabha led by Radhagupta (the then minister (Mahaamatya) of the Mauryan Empire) decided that Kunala would proceed to subjugate the revolt of Takshashila (Taxila), Tishyaraksha conceived a plot. The plot succeeded after the conquest by Kunala.

As per the plot, Ashoka had to request two very precious jewels from the governor of Takshashila which were believed to have been the most unusual of their kind. The decisive language of the letter written by Tishyaraksha was sent by Ashoka who did not understand the hidden meaning and therefore could not explain it to Kunala. However, Kunala immediately understood the hidden meaning, but due to his love for his father and his loyalty towards Magadha, he felt forced to remove his own eyes. Then he sent both of his eyes to the court of Magadha at Pataliputra. Ashoka realized his fault but by then it was too late. Immediately Radhagupta ordered Tishyaraksha's death. However, it is believed that Tishyaraksha committed suicide after finding out this news.

In popular culture
Haraprasad Shastri's second novel " Kanchanmala" features Tisshyaraksha in a prominent role. The story of Tishyaraksha has also been captured by the Bengali writer Samaresh Majumdar in his novel "Saranagata", however, with very different strokes and shades that are attributed to the life of Ashoka.The same line of story was developed by a prominent Bengali dramatist Amit Maitra into a drama titled 'Dharmashok'.

References 

230s BC deaths
3rd-century BC Indian people
3rd-century BC women
Ancient Indian women
Concubines
Indian female classical dancers
Indian queen consorts
Mauryan dynasty
Wives of Ashoka
Ancient people who committed suicide
Suicides in India
Ancient dancers